The 1984 LFF Lyga was the 63rd season of the LFF Lyga football competition in Lithuania.  It was contested by 18 teams, and Granitas Klaipėda won the championship.

League standings

References
RSSSF

LFF Lyga seasons
football
Lith